Mathias Johan Fjørtoft Løvik (born 6 December 2003) is a Norwegian footballer who plays as a left-back for Molde.

Career statistics

Club

Notes

References

2003 births
Living people
Norwegian footballers
Norway youth international footballers
Association football midfielders
Molde FK players
Norwegian Third Division players